Kaisma Parish was a municipality located in Pärnu County, Estonia. On 27 October 2009 it was merged into Vändra Parish. It had a population of 566 (as of 1 January 2009) and an area of 183.98 km².

Settlements
Villages
Kaisma - Kergu - Kõnnu - Metsaküla - Metsavere - Rahkama - Sohlu

References

External links
 

Former municipalities of Estonia
Geography of Pärnu County